HK Nik's Brih Riga was an ice hockey team in Riga, Latvia. They played in the Latvian Hockey League.

History
The club was founded in 1987. Starting in 1992, the club participated in the Latvian Hockey League. The club won the Latvian Hockey League three times, and reached the finals twice. They participated in the 1996 IIHF Federation Cup, where they finished third in Group C.

The team was dissolved in 2000, and two new teams were founded in Riga, Juniors Riga and Vilki OP/LaRocca. A large number of Nik's Brih players went to play for Vilki.

Results
 1992/93: 4th place
 1993/94: 2nd place
 1994/95: 1st place
 1995/96: 3rd place
 1996/97: 2nd place
 1997/98: 1st place
 1998/99: 1st place
 1999/2000: 3rd place

Notable players
 Viktors Durnovs
 Sergejs Nikitins
 Ervīns Muštukovs

References

Ice hockey teams in Riga
Defunct ice hockey teams in Latvia
Latvian Hockey League teams
Ice hockey clubs established in 1987
Sports clubs disestablished in 2000